Vivian Elizabeth Trimble (born May 24, 1963 in New York City) is an American musician, best known as the keyboardist in the band Luscious Jackson from 1991 to 1998. She also joined bandmate Jill Cunniff under the name Kostars and recorded an album released in 1996. After leaving Luscious Jackson in April 1998, Trimble formed a duo with Josephine Wiggs named Dusty Trails, releasing an album in 2000.

References

1963 births
Living people
Feminist musicians
Luscious Jackson members
American rock keyboardists
Musicians from New York City
Dusty Trails members
Kostars members